Dhumketu is a 2016 Bangladeshi romantic drama film. The directed by Shafique Hasan and produced, screenplay, story and dialogue by Munir Reza under the banner of Munni Production. It feature Shakib Khan and Pori Moni played in lead roles and Tanha Tasnia, Ali Raj, Amit Hasan, Parveen Sultana Diti and Rebecca played supporting roles in the film.

Cast 
 Shakib Khan - Shaon
 Pori Moni - Rukh Moni
 Amit Hasan
 Tanha Tasnia
 Parveen Sultana Diti
 Ali Raj
 Rebecca
 Shiba Shanu
 Nazneen Akter Happy - Item Number, special appearance in the song of "Majhe Majhe Ashi"

Promotion 
The first look teaser of the film was released on Live Technologies's YouTube on January 9, 2016. After that the second teaser of the released on November 30, 2016. The film got an uncut certificate from the Bangladesh Film Censor Board on November 15, 2016.

Soundtrack 
The film's songs are composed by Ahmed Humayun with lyrics penned by Sudip Kumar Dip.

"Majhe Majhe Ashi" - Pulok, Roma, Moon, Ahmed Humayun
"Aaj Barabo" - Moumita Tashrin Nodi, Kishore
"Jibone Cholar Pothe" - Munisha
"Chupi Chupi Mon" - Imran Mahmudul, খেয়া
"N/A" - Kumar Bishwajit

Release 
The film was released on December 9, 2016.

References

External links 
 

Bengali-language Bangladeshi films
2016 films
Bangladeshi romantic drama films
2016 romantic drama films
2010s Bengali-language films
Films scored by Ahmed Humayun